Adirondack may refer to:

Places
Adirondack Mountains, New York, US
Adirondack Park, a protected area in the US, containing a large portion of the Adirondack Mountains
Adirondack County, New York, a proposed county in New York
Adirondack, New York, a place in New York

Transport
Adirondack (train), an Amtrak passenger rail route connecting New York City and Montreal
Adirondack guideboat, a rowed skiff, built to be carried between bodies of water, originally designed for hunting
USS Adirondack (1862), a gunboat during the American Civil War that sank off the Bahamas
USS Adirondack (YT-44), an iron-hulled screw tug originally known as the Underwriter
USS Adirondack (ID-1270), commissioned into the Navy in 1917 and used as a floating barracks until 1919
USS Adirondack (AGC-15), an amphibious force flagship in service from 1945 to 1955

Other uses
Adirondack (Mars), Mars Exploration Rover Spirit's first target rock for investigation
Adirondack Architecture, an American style of construction
Adirondack Beverages, a soft drink company based in New York state, that produces the Adirondack brand sodas
Adirondack Canoe Classic, a three-day,  canoe race from Old Forge to Saranac Lake (also known as the "90-miler")
Adirondack chair, a type of chair used primarily in an outdoors setting
Adirondack Community College (US), a two-year college located in the state of New York
Adirondack Experience, a museum
Adirondack Flames, former American Hockey League team (2014–15)
Adirondack Great Camps
Adirondack Phantoms, former American Hockey League team (2009–2014)
Adirondack Red Wings, former American Hockey League team (1979–1999)
Adirondack shelter, a style of lean-to
Picea rubens or Adirondack, a species of spruce tree used to make musical instruments